Aleksandr Erminingeldovich Arbuzov (12 October 1877 – 22 January 1968) was a Russian Empire and Soviet chemist who discovered the Michaelis–Arbuzov reaction.

A native of Bilyarsk, Arbuzov studied in the Kazan University under Alexander Zaytsev. He graduated in 1900 and became professor at the same university in 1911. After World War II he was put in charge of the Soviet Institute of Organic Chemistry.

Arbuzov was awarded the Stalin Prize in 1943.

In addition to his scientific research, Arbuzov also wrote A Brief Sketch of the Development of Organic Chemistry in Russian (1948).

References

Further reading

1877 births
1968 deaths
People from Tatarstan
People from Spassky Uyezd (Kazan Governorate)
Chemists from the Russian Empire
Inventors from the Russian Empire
Soviet chemists
Soviet inventors
20th-century chemists
Kazan Federal University alumni
Full Members of the USSR Academy of Sciences
Heroes of Socialist Labour
Stalin Prize winners
Recipients of the Order of Lenin
Recipients of the Order of the Red Banner of Labour
Burials at Arskoe Cemetery